The 1933–34 Segunda División season saw 10 teams participate in the second flight Spanish league. Sevilla and Atlético were promoted to Primera División. There were no relegations to Tercera División because there will be more teams on the next season.

Teams

Final table

Results

External links
LFP website

Segunda División seasons
2
Spain